The Red Men Museum and Library is an American history museum in Waco, Texas. It also houses the archives and presents the official history of the Improved Order of Red Men, a patriotic fraternal organization with traditions attributed to Native Americans.

Organization 
Robert E. Davis, the former national secretary for the Red Men, was an avid collector of both Red Men memorabilia as well as an eclectic collection of artifacts he had purchased at auction. He willed his collection to the organization which founded the museum in 1991.

The organization is incorporated as the Texas Red Men Foundation.  The complex is home to both the headquarters of the national Red Men fraternal organization and the Great Council of Texas office. The Red Men Museum takes part in Texas Brazos Trail, a historical tourism effort by the State of Texas and is also a member of the Museum Association of Waco

Collection 
The collection consists of a very eclectic group of artifacts, mostly pertaining to American history. Included within the collection is a peace blanket from the Apache leader Geronimo, a bugle from the Gettysburg Battlefield, a writing desk belonging to Aaron Burr and moccasins from Chiricahua leader Cochise.

Library 
The museum houses a non-circulating archive of works available to the general public for study.  In addition to Red Men organization documents, the collection contains historical documents relating to World War II, including the Nuremberg War Criminal Trial reports, and the complete Warren Commission report.

Building 
The museum is located near the Waco Independent School District football stadium and sports complex.  The brick building is designed to look reminiscent of Thomas Jefferson's Monticello and also includes a hall and commercial kitchen for events.

See also 
 List of museums in Central Texas

References

External links 
 Red Men Museum and Library

History museums in Texas
Improved Order of Red Men
Museums in McLennan County, Texas
Buildings and structures in Waco, Texas
Tourist attractions in Waco, Texas
Museums established in 1991
Libraries in Waco, Texas
Neoclassical architecture in Texas
1991 establishments in Texas